Bernard "Berend" Carp (17 April 1901, Sragi, Lampung, Dutch East Indies – 22 July 1966, Hout Bay, South Africa) was an Olympic sailor from the Netherlands, who represented his native country at the 1920 Summer Olympics in Ostend, Belgium. With helmsman and brother Joop Carp and fellow crew member Petrus Wernink, sailing the Dutch boat Oranje, Carp took the Gold in the 6.5 Metre.

Professional life
In 1922 Carp started at the de n.v. Erven Lucas Bols in Amsterdam. He advanced his career up to director in 1936. In 1946 he moved to Cape Town to lead a distillery of Lucas Bols.

Personal life
Carp financed several ornithological expeditions during the 1950s is Southern Africa (Namibia). He published the story of these expeditions in his book I Chose Africa.

Publications by Berend Carp

Sources

References

External links
 
 

1901 births
1966 deaths
People from Lampung
Dutch male sailors (sport)
Sailors at the 1920 Summer Olympics – 6.5 Metre
Olympic sailors of the Netherlands
Medalists at the 1920 Summer Olympics
Olympic medalists in sailing
Olympic gold medalists for the Netherlands
Dutch people of the Dutch East Indies